Khofifah Indar Parawansa (born 19 May 1965) is an Indonesian politician who is the current Governor of East Java. Previously she served as the 27th Minister of Social Affairs. She resigned from the position in January 2018 in order to run in the East Java gubernatorial election.

She had previously served as the fifth Minister for Female Empowerment, as well as the chairwoman of the Family Planning Board in the National Unity Cabinet, and was also a former Deputy Speaker of the Indonesian House of Representatives. She was the first member of parliament who gave a formal critical speech toward Soeharto regime, highlighting 1997 General Election fraud during the 1998 General Session of People's Consultative Assembly.

In August 2015, she launched the "2015 Prostitution-Free National Movement" during a working visit to Jayapura, Papua. The Tanjung Elmo red-light district located in Sentani in nearby Jayapura Regency was to be closed down. Commercial sex workers were to be sent back to their hometowns and given Rp 5 million (about US$500) from the Social Affairs Ministry in addition to another Rp 5 million given by the Jayapura provincial government, in order to find "decent jobs". In early 2016, she announced the government aimed to shut down 100 red-light districts by 2019 in a bid to eradicate prostitution. As of February 2016, 68 red-light districts had been closed down.

In response to homophobic rhetoric from some officials and religious preachers, Khofifah on 16 January 2016 told the House of Representatives that the Social Affairs Ministry does not acknowledge the categorisation or term "LGBT" (lesbian, gay, bisexual and transgender) but only recognises "people living with HIV/AIDS and minorities". She said the ministry's task is "to restore the respective social behaviors of men and women", an effort which "needs to be maximized in order to go back to the way it was before".

Responding to the Jakarta November 2016 protests by Muslim groups and extremists against the city's Christian and ethnic Chinese governor Basuki Tjahaja Purnama, Khofifah as well as Indonesian National Armed Forces Commander Gatot Nurmantyo, Indonesian National Police Tito Karnavian and Islamic activist Yenny Wahid marched in support of interfaith unity.

Early life
Khofifah was born on 19 May 1965 in Surabaya, East Java.

Personal life 
She was married to Indar Parawansa (also rendered as Parawangsa), also known as Daeng Beta (born on 26 July 1960 in Palu, Sulawesi). Khofifah has four children, a daughter and three sons: Fatimahsang Mannagalli Parawansa, Jalaluddin Mannagalli Parawansa, Yusuf Mannagalli Parawansa and Ali Mannagalli Parawansa.

See also
List of Governors of East Java

References

1965 births
Airlangga University alumni
Indonesian civil servants
Governors of East Java
Indonesian Sunni Muslims
Living people
National Awakening Party politicians
People from Surabaya
Working Cabinet (Joko Widodo)
Social affairs ministers of Indonesia
Women government ministers of Indonesia
Women governors of provinces of Indonesia
Women members of the People's Representative Council
21st-century Indonesian women politicians
21st-century Indonesian politicians